The following is a list of training films produced for the United States Army and Navy by the Walt Disney Studio during World War II. Most of these films were not sole productions of Disney, but were collaborations with other entities such as the First Motion Picture Unit (FMPU) or Frank Capra's signal corps.

Disney only produced the animated portions of these films. Many Disney artists and animators (as well as artists from other animation studios) worked at FMPU simultaneously, so not all FMPU films that include animation are Disney products.

In many cases the studio did not receive credit, which has made the task of identification somewhat difficult. Additionally, many of these films were reissued and even retitled, re-numbered and even re-edited, so the original elements may not survive.

Th information on this list comes from various sources such as the long out of print book Donald Duck Joins Up by Richard Shale and other film indexes that deal with Army and Navy films.

Production for Armed Forces

Propaganda series and films

Note: Walt Disney Productions is uncredited on all films in this section.

Educational & Training films
Note: Walt Disney Productions is generally credited on these films, unless otherwise noted.

1942

1943

1944

1945

Home media
Some of these propaganda and training films can be found uncut and uncensored on
Walt Disney Treasures: On the Front Lines

See also
Walt Disney's World War II propaganda productions
List of Disney animated shorts
List of Disney live-action shorts

References

External links
The Big Cartoon Database - Disney's Armed Forces Shorts
The Encyclopedia of Disney Animated Shorts - Disney's Wartime and Armed Forces Shorts

Disney-related lists
 
Disney
American propaganda during World War II